Maceration  may refer to:

 Maceration (food), in food preparation
 Maceration (wine), a step in wine-making
 Carbonic maceration, a wine-making technique
 Maceration (sewage), in sewage treatment
 Maceration (bone), a method of preparing bones
 Acid maceration, the use of an acid to extract micro-fossils from rock
 Maceration, in chemistry, the preparation of an extract by solvent extraction
 Maceration, in biology, the mechanical breakdown of ingested food into chyme
 Skin maceration, in dermatology, the softening and whitening of skin that is kept constantly wet
 Maceration, in poultry farming, a method of chick culling